The 2011 Indy Lights season was a season of open wheel motor racing. It was the 26th season of the series and the tenth sanctioned by IndyCar, acting as the primary support series for the IZOD IndyCar Series. It began March 27, 2011 in St. Petersburg and ended on October 16 at the Las Vegas Motor Speedway and featured thirteen events: six on ovals, one on a permanent road course, and six on temporary street courses. The series was won by American driver Josef Newgarden, driving for Sam Schmidt Motorsports. Newgarden won the title by 94 points over team mate and fellow rookie Esteban Guerrieri of Argentina.

The season featured the series' first non-IndyCar Series support race since the 2007 Liberty Challenge (at the Indianapolis Motor Speedway) when it was the main event at the Grand Prix de Trois-Rivières. It was Indy Lights' first event at Trois-Rivières since 1998. The series also race at the New Hampshire Motor Speedway for the first time since 1995 and the new Baltimore street circuit in support of the IndyCars.

Team and driver chart
 All drivers will compete in Firestone Firehawk–shod, Dallara chassis.

Schedule

Race results

Race summaries

Round 1: Streets of St. Petersburg
Sunday March 27, 2011 – 10:30 a.m. EDT
Streets of St. Petersburg – St. Petersburg, Florida; Temporary street circuit, 
Distance: 45 laps / 
Race weather: , partly cloudy
Pole position winner: #7 Esteban Guerrieri, 1:07.6903 sec, 
Most laps led: #11 Josef Newgarden, 34
Race Report:

Round 2: Barber Motorsports Park
Sunday April 10, 2011 – 12:15 p.m. CDT (1:15 p.m. EDT)
Barber Motorsports Park – Birmingham, Alabama; Permanent road course, 
Distance: 40 laps / 
Race weather: , partly cloudy
Pole position winner: #22 Víctor García, 1:17.2793 sec, 
Most laps led: #22 Víctor García, 40
Race Report: Víctor García took the first victory of his open-wheel racing career after taking a flag-to-flag to victory despite pressure from Stefan Wilson for the majority of the race, seeing his lead twice dwindled by caution periods. Peter Dempsey took his second placing of third in as many races as he moved into second place in the championship standings. Championship leader Josef Newgarden held on to his championship lead despite having to make a pit-stop to replace a flat front tire, but recovered to finish in sixth position in the race. The race was punctuated by three caution periods, the first of which being on the first lap after Newgarden made contact with Esteban Guerrieri which sent Guerrieri into contact with team mate Victor Carbone, eliminating Guerrieri on the spot and Carbone in the pits. The other two periods were caused by drivers running off track; Gustavo Yacamán ran off-track on lap four, but managed to restart several laps down, but the other period caused by David Ostella, did not see Ostella restart.

Round 3: Long Beach 100
Sunday April 17, 2011 – 11:05 a.m. PDT (2:05 p.m. EDT)
Streets of Long Beach – Long Beach, California; Temporary street circuit, 
Distance: 45 laps / ; reduced to 43 laps /  due to 1-hour time limit
Race weather: , cloudy
Pole position winner: #7 Esteban Guerrieri, 1:13.6957 sec, 
Most laps led: #11 Josef Newgarden, 31
Race Report: Conor Daly became the series' third different winner in the 2011 season, after taking advantage of a late-race mistake by team-mate and championship leader Josef Newgarden. After a waved off start to the race, Esteban Guerrieri in another Sam Schmidt car led the field from pole, but did not lead the race beyond that after being passed by Peter Dempsey at Turn 9. Dempsey held the lead until lap ten when he hit the wall at the same corner, knocking himself out of the race. Newgarden then picked up the lead from Guerrieri and Daly; Daly overhauling Guerrieri at the restart, and started to hunt down Newgarden. With a few minutes remaining, Newgarden's car hopped under the bumps, snatched a brake and ended up in the turn eight tire wall. Daly led the field under the caution to the timed ending of the race which curtailed the race two laps early. Guerrieri finished second ahead of Stefan Wilson, who finished third despite a trip down an escape road.

Round 4: Firestone Freedom 100
Friday May 27, 2011 – 12:30 p.m. EDT
Indianapolis Motor Speedway – Speedway, Indiana; Permanent racing facility, 
Distance: 40 laps / 
Race weather: , overcast
Pole position winner: #77 Bryan Clauson (qualifying cancelled; field set by owner points)
Most laps led: #11 Josef Newgarden, 30
Race Report:
Josef Newgarden took his second series victory, and with erstwhile championship leader Conor Daly not contesting the oval events of the championship, Newgarden assumed the championship lead. Newgarden's Sam Schmidt Motorsports team mate, Bryan Clauson dropped back from his début pole, with Newgarden and Víctor García each leading part of the first lap before Newgarden assumed it at the line. Stefan Wilson, Anders Krohn and Esteban Guerrieri also led the race at stages prior to Newgarden taking the lead for good on lap 15. Krohn had undone his work to advance to the front by spinning under caution – after Victor Carbone's crash – which put him to the rear of the field, but pitted for new tires, and eventually made his way back up the field. The second caution period was caused by Gustavo Yacamán spinning into the wall and was eventually collected by Juan Pablo Garcia and James Winslow. Yacamán was transferred to Methodist Hospital with neck pain.

After Peter Dempsey spun under the yellow, Duarte Ferreira brought out the third caution a lap after the restart, spinning in Turn 2 and collected the car of Brandon Wagner, ending the race for both drivers. After a waved off restart, again one lap was run before a caution period was necessitated; Clauson, Krohn and Krohn's Belardi team mate Jorge Goncalvez went three-wide into Turn 1, with Goncalvez clipping the rear-left tire of Clauson's car. Krohn spun in avoidance, as Goncalvez went into the barrier on the outside of Turn 1, before impacting the inside wall halfway down the straight between Turns 1 and 2. The impact broke the car into two pieces with the tub going onto its side along the track before hitting the retaining wall in Turn 2 and righted what was left of the car. Goncalvez was also transferred to Methodist, but was said to be alert and awake. The debris from the crash prevented the race from returning to green – resulting in an end tally of 22 of the race's 40 laps running under caution – and Newgarden took victory ahead of team mate Guerrieri, Víctor García, Wilson and Clauson, with only 10 of the 18 cars that started the race running at the flag.

Round 5: David Hobbs 100
Sunday June 19, 2011 – 1:00 p.m. CDT (2:00 p.m. EDT)
Milwaukee Mile – West Allis, Wisconsin; Permanent racing facility, 
Distance: 100 laps / 
Race weather: , overcast
Pole position winner: #7 Esteban Guerrieri, 49.0454 sec,  (2-lap)
Most laps led: #7 Esteban Guerrieri, 100
Race Report:

Round 6: Sukup 100
Saturday June 25, 2011 – 5:40 p.m. CDT (6:40 p.m. EDT)
Iowa Speedway – Newton, Iowa; Permanent racing facility, 
Distance: 115 laps / 
Race weather: , overcast
Pole position winner: #7 Esteban Guerrieri, 40.0332 sec,  (2-lap)
Most laps led: #11 Josef Newgarden, 90
Race Report:

Round 7: Toronto 100
Sunday July 10, 2011 – 12:15 p.m. EDT
Streets of Toronto – Toronto, Ontario; Temporary street circuit, 
Distance: 50 laps / ; reduced to 49 laps /  due to 1-hour time limit
Race weather: , cloudy
Pole position winner: #7 Esteban Guerrieri, 1:02.9865 sec, 
Most laps led: #5 Stefan Wilson, 29
Race Report: Stefan Wilson took his first Indy Lights victory after capitalising on a mistake by pole-sitter Esteban Guerrieri, and led the race for its final 29 laps after Guerrieri had led the first 20. Wilson led home an Andretti Autosport 1–2 after his new team-mate Peter Dempsey finished second, after close battling with both Gustavo Yacamán and championship leader Josef Newgarden. Newgarden would later make contact with Dempsey's car, and had to pit, resulting in an eighth place finish. Yacamán ended up completing the podium ahead of Guerrieri and Anders Krohn. Four of the 13-car grid failed to reach the finish of the race, all due to contact.

Round 8: Edmonton Twin 100s
Saturday July 23, 2011 – 2:00 p.m. MDT (4:00 p.m. EDT) & Sunday July 24, 2011 – 10:20 a.m. MDT (12:20 p.m. EDT)
Edmonton City Centre Airport – Edmonton, Alberta; Temporary airport course, 
Distance: 2 races of 40 laps / ; Race 1 reduced to 36 laps /  due to 1-hour time limit
Pole position winner: #11 Josef Newgarden, 1:22.7721 sec,  (Race 1, qualifying); 1:22.9337 sec,  (Race 2, fastest lap of Race 1)
Most laps led: #7 Esteban Guerrieri, 36 (Race 1); #11 Josef Newgarden, 27 (Race 2)
Race Report: Esteban Guerrieri took his second victory of the season, after leading every lap of the race to move closer to his team-mate and championship leader Josef Newgarden. Newgarden had started the race from pole position, but a move by Guerrieri at Turn 5 allowed him to take the lead just before the opening caution of the race, caused by series rookie Tyler Dueck running into the back of David Ostella, and the field concertinaed, with Daniel Morad, Daniel Herrington and Stefan Wilson also involved, with Dueck, Ostella and Morad all out on the spot. Third place went to another series rookie, with Oliver Webb finishing ahead of Wilson with Bruno Andrade just ahead of Gustavo Yacamán to complete the top five placing. The race's only other retirees came as a result of an incident between Victor Carbone and Peter Dempsey. Dempsey tried to take Carbone into Turn 1 on lap 28, with the two drivers interlocking wheels on the corner exit, sending both drivers into the wall. Carbone's car launched Dempsey's car upside-down, but Dempsey emerged without injury. Newgarden comfortably won race two after slight contact with Guerrieri, which left Guerrieri down the order. Wilson and Dempsey completed the podium.

Round 9: Grand Prix de Trois-Rivières
Sunday August 7, 2011 – 1:30 p.m. EDT
Circuit Trois-Rivières – Trois-Rivières, Quebec; Temporary street circuit, 
Distance: 60 laps / ; reduced to 58 laps /  due to rain
Race weather: , cloudy
Pole position winner: #7 Esteban Guerrieri, 57.4541 sec, 
Most laps led: #7 Esteban Guerrieri, 58
Race Report:

Round 10: New Hampshire 100
Sunday August 14, 2011 – 1:15 p.m. EDT
New Hampshire Motor Speedway – Loudon, New Hampshire; Permanent racing facility, 
Distance: 100 laps / 
Race weather: , overcast
Pole position winner: #11 Josef Newgarden, 49.4908 sec,  (2-lap)
Most laps led: #11 Josef Newgarden, 100
Race Report: Josef Newgarden became the first driver since Thiago Medeiros in 2004 to lap the entire field en route to winning an Indy Lights race, further extending his championship points lead.

Round 11: Streets of Baltimore
Sunday September 4, 2011 – 12:15 p.m. EDT
Streets of Baltimore – Baltimore, Maryland; Temporary street circuit, 
Distance: 35 laps / 
Race weather: , scattered clouds
Pole position winner: #77 Conor Daly, 1:27.8114 sec, 
Most laps led: #77 Conor Daly, 22
Race Report:

Round 12: Drive Smart Buckle-Up Kentucky 100
Sunday October 2, 2011 – 12:30 p.m. EDT
Kentucky Speedway – Sparta, Kentucky; Permanent racing facility, 
Distance: 67 laps / 
Race weather: , partly cloudy
Pole position winner: #5 Stefan Wilson, 55.5988 sec,  (2-lap)
Most laps led: #5 Stefan Wilson, 47
Race Report:

Round 13: Las Vegas 100
Sunday October 16, 2011 – 9:45 a.m. PDT (12:45 p.m. EDT)
Las Vegas Motor Speedway – Las Vegas, Nevada; Permanent racing facility, 
Distance: 67 laps / 
Race weather: , clear skies
Pole position winner: #3 Victor Carbone, 57.9685 sec,  (2-lap)
Most laps led: #11 Josef Newgarden, 63
Race Report:

Driver standings 

 Ties in points broken by number of wins, or best finishes.

References

External links
Indy Lights Series website

Indy Lights seasons
Indy Lights
Indy Lights